Jonathan Witney Garriock Wills (born 17 June 1947, in Oxford), is a Scottish journalist, author and former editor of The Shetland Times newspaper. In 1996, Wills's company was sued by the newspaper for deep linking.

Career

Wills is chiefly famous for his involvement in a notable lawsuit in 1996 brought against him as publisher of The Shetland News website. The plaintiff in the case, The Shetland Times, accused Wills' company, Zetnews Ltd., of infringing their copyright by using hyperlinks which bypassed their main webpage. Using so-called "deep linking", Wills bypassed the framework that the Times used to publish news articles on its website, specifically the main page and the interspersed advertisements.  The case was settled out of court with The Shetland News agreeing to acknowledge any Shetland Times story which appeared on its website.

Wills was also the first student Rector of the University of Edinburgh, a position he achieved in 1971.

Books by Jonathan Wills
Old Rock – Shetland in pictures
A Place in the Sun: Shetland and Oil, Mainstream, 1991
Innocent Passage: The Wreck of the Tanker Braer, Mainstream Publishing, 1993
The Travels of Magnus Pole, Chatto & Windus / Canongate Publishing, 1984
Wilma Widdershins and the Muckle Tree: A Shetland Story, Bressabooks, 1991
The Lands of Garth: A short history of Calback Ness, 1978

References

Living people
Scottish journalists
Shetland writers
Scottish children's writers
Rectors of the University of Edinburgh
1947 births